The greater dog-like bat (Peropteryx kappleri) is a bat species found from southern Mexico through Brazil and Peru.

Description
Fur color can vary, with some individuals dark brown and others light brown. The ventral fur is paler than the dorsal fur. It has large black ears.

References

Bats of South America
Bats of Brazil
Mammals of Colombia
Mammals of Guyana
Emballonuridae
Mammals described in 1867
Taxa named by Wilhelm Peters
Bats of Central America